Daniel Boldor (born Daniel Cristian Boldor) is a Roma businessman from Baia Mare, Romania and CEO of Exiteco SRL, accused of fraud and forgery after his company sold thousands of tons of mining sludge to international metal traders as "gold [or copper] concentrate".

Background
In 2001, at age 24, Boldor left Baia Mare and travelled to West London, where he worked in the building trade. His first job was demolishing bathrooms and kitchens in the Harrow and Notting Hill neighborhoods. By 2007, he had set up his own construction firm operating across the United Kingdom and brought his four younger brothers from Romania to manage his various building sites. His projects included refurbishing the 100-room Enterprise hotel in Earls Court and renovation of the Harrow Central Mosque.

Boldor claims the inspiration to start his business came to him in 2011, during a conversation with a former manager of the Cuprom mines. The local, he says, described Cuprom's mining equipment under Ceaușescu to be "rudimentary", incapable of fully extracting the most fine-grained gold or copper from its ore. Since Curpom was built on a swamp, this local said, the only way to maintain structural integrity while building out the complex over the years had been to use this under-extracted backfill to fill in the marshland. This, Boldor claims, is why the dirt around the Cuprom complex contains millions of dollars of unprocessed gold and copper.

In 2012, Baia Mare's mayor declared hundreds of Roma shanties just outside the city unfit for habitation and forced the families to relocate into an abandoned block of offices in the Cuprom complex. For decades, Roma had made a living selling scrap metal from the same facilities. Boldor believed the only way to pull these Roma out of poverty was to show them what a successful Roma looked like. In 2013, he began hiring the Roma who had been forcibly relocated into the Cuprom offices to dig out, package, and sell the so-called "metal concentrate" for him.

Exitico SRL and Minero Remediation

In late 2015, 123 containers containing 2,723 tons of material sold to Chinese investors by Boldor's company arrived in Hong Kong. The containers were supposed to contain copper concentrate, a mining product which should have at least 30% or more of pure copper by weight, according to industry standards. However, when environmental regulators in Shanghai performed a customs check on one container, they found black rubble littered with chunks of concrete rubble and rusty bottle caps. Upon testing, the material was found to contain unsafe levels of cadmium and arsenic, a mark of possible mining waste rather than "ore concentrate". After being turned away at ports in Thailand and Malaysia, and a year of sitting in the docks in Hong Kong, authorities shipped the materials back to Romania where it sat in an industrial park in Constanța. An anonymous email in November 2016 alerted an official in Romania's National Environmental Guard to the incident, who forwarded it for investigation to Constanța's public prosecutor's office.

By 2017, according to Boldor's records, his company had shipped 10 million tons of "mineral concentrate" out of Baia Mare to various international partners and had received more than 6 million euros in payment.

2018 prosecution
In June 2018, the public prosecutor's office in Constanța filed an indictment against Boldor on charges of money laundering, customs fraud, document forgery, improper collection and transport of hazardous waste, and tax evasion.

The charges are based on a series of business deals from 2013 to 2018 in which thousands of tons of mining sludge from the abandoned Cuprom mining factory near Baia Mare were shipped to international investors and corporations as "metal concentrate" (specifically gold and copper) in exchange for millions of euros. The Cuprom mine and refinery complex was originally built under the administration of former Communist general secretary Nicolae Ceaușescu, and had since fallen into ruin. Boldor's clients were metal traders in countries including China, Thailand, South Korea, and the United States who, after receiving the shipments, claimed the materials were worthless and accused Boldor of obtaining falsified laboratory certifications.

2021
As of 2021, Boldor's copmpany still owned around 40% of the Cuprom facility and planned to redevelop it into an industrial park using funds from selling supposedly vast under-extracted ore deposits underneath the mining complex. A second company headed by Brașov businessman Cristian Eftinca holds the other 60% and plans to develop the lands into 25 MWh photovoltaic park, along with the remaining 351.4-meter tall Cuprom chimney into a tourist attraction as the tallest chimney in Romania and third tallest in Europe.

References

Living people
Romani-speaking people
Romanian business executives
Romanian mining businesspeople
Year of birth missing (living people)